The Diocese of Gallese (Latin: Dioecesis Gallesina) was a Roman Catholic diocese located in the town of Gallese near the city of Viterbo in the Province of Viterbo. In 1805, it was united with the Diocese of Civita Castellana e Orte to form the Diocese of Civita Castellana, Orte e Gallese. It was restored as a Titular Episcopal See in 1991.

Ordinaries
Girolamo Garimberti (Galimbertu) (1563-1575 Died)
Gabriele de Alexandris, O.P. (1566-1569 Resigned)

See also
Catholic Church in Italy

References

Former Roman Catholic dioceses in Italy